This is a list of important publications in chemistry, organized by field.

Some factors that correlate with publication notability include:
Topic creator – A publication that created a new topic.
Breakthrough – A publication that changed scientific knowledge significantly.
Influence – A publication which has significantly influenced the world or has had a massive impact on the teaching of chemistry.

Foundations

The Sceptical Chymist
 The Sceptical Chymist - Robert Boyle 1661

Description: Boyle, in the form of a dialogue, argued that chemical theories should be firmly grounded in experiment before their acceptance, and for the foundation of chemistry as a science separate from medicine and alchemy.

Importance: Topic Creator, Influence. Boyle, in this book, became the first to argue that experiment should form the basis of all theory, a common practice in chemistry today. He also expounded on a rudimentary atomic theory and the existence of chemical elements beyond the classic earth, fire, air, and water. He is seen as the father of chemistry, and this is his most celebrated book, with continued relevance to the present day.

Traité Élémentaire de Chimie
 Traité Élémentaire de Chimie (Elementary Treatise of Chemistry) - Antoine Lavoisier
 Traité Élémentaire de Chimie, 1789, available in English as Elementary Treatise of Chemistry

Description: This book was intended as an introduction to new theories in chemistry and as such, was one of the first Chemistry textbooks.

Importance: Introduction, Influence. Aside from being one of the first chemistry textbooks, the book was one of the first to state the Law of conservation of mass, define a chemical element, and contain a list of known elements.

Méthode de Nomenclature Chimique 
 Guyton de Morveau, L. B.; Lavoisier, A. L.; Berthollet, C. L.; de Fourcroy, A. F.
 Méthode de Nomenclature Chimique, Paris, 1787, available in English as Chymical Nomenclature.
 Some details and a picture available at IUPAC nomenclature#History

Description: This publication laid out a logical system for naming chemical substances (mainly chemical elements  and inorganic compounds).

Importance: Prior to this publication, a multitude of names were often used for the same substance.  This publication led to an international consensus on how to name chemical substances.

A New System of Chemical Philosophy
 A New System of Chemical Philosophy - John Dalton, 1808–1827

Description: This book explained Dalton's theory of atoms and its applications to chemistry.

Importance: Topic Creator, Breakthrough, Influence. The book was one of the first to describe a modern atomic theory, a theory that lies at the basis of modern chemistry. It is the first to introduce a table of atomic and molecular weights. Surprisingly, given the period in which the book was written, of the five properties of atoms that Dalton listed, only two have been shown to be incorrect.

The Dependence Between the Properties of the Atomic Weights of the Elements
The Dependence Between the Properties of the Atomic Weights of the Elements - Dmitri Mendeleev
 Zeitschrift für Chemie 12, 405–406 (1869)
 Online version

Description and Importance: In this paper the periodic table was introduced.
Notice that the table in the above link is the original one. Since then the table structure was slightly changed and new elements were added to it.

Organic chemistry

Science of Synthesis: Houben-Weyl Methods of Molecular Transformations
 Volume titles are here 
 Thieme: Stuttgart, 48 volumes, 2000 – 2009 (print and electronic version available)

Description: Contains synthetic models selected by world-renowned experts, with full experimental procedures and background information. Considers methods from journals, books, and patent literature from the early 19th century up to the present day and presents important synthetic methods for all classes of compounds. Critically evaluates the preparative applicability and significance of the synthetic methods.

Importance: A reference publication.

March's Advanced Organic Chemistry: Reactions, Mechanisms, and Structure
Michael B. Smith, Jerry March
 Wiley-Interscience, 5th edition, 2001, 
 Wiley-Interscience, 6th edition, 2007, 

Description: A comprehensive reference for organic chemistry with over 25,000 references.

Importance: A reference publication.

The Logic of Chemical Synthesis
Elias James Corey, Xue-Min Cheng
Wiley-Interscience, 1995, 

Description: Describes the logic underlying the rational design of complex organic synthesis.

Importance: Breakthrough, Influence

Protective Groups in Organic Synthesis
Theodora Greene, Peter G. M. Wuts
Wiley-Interscience, 1st edition, 1981
Wiley-Interscience, 2nd edition, 1991
Wiley-Interscience, 3rd edition, 1999, 
Wiley-Interscience, 4th edition, 2007, 
Wiley-Interscience, 5th edition, 2014, 

Description: A comprehensive reference for the usage of protecting groups in organic synthesis.

Importance: A reference publication.

Comprehensive Organic Transformations
Richard C. Larock
Wiley-VCH
1st edition:
2nd edition: 1999, 

Description: A standard reference for the practicing organic chemist.  These books are just enormous lists of key references indexed by functional group transformations.

Importance: A reference publication.

Stereochemistry of Carbon Compounds
Ernest L. Eliel
1st edition: 1962
Current edition: renamed Stereochemistry of Organic Compounds, 1994 (by Eliel and Samuel H. Wilen)

Description: systematic and complete exposition of all aspects of organic stereochemistry

Importance: standard advanced text for organic stereochemistry.

The Conservation of Orbital Symmetry
Robert Burns Woodward and Roald Hoffmann
Verlag Chemie Academic Press
1st edition: 1970

Description: This book summarizes a series of publications (the first in 1965) by the Nobel Prize winning authors where they describe the mechanism of a series of pericyclic reactions based upon the conservation of orbital symmetry leading to what are now called the Woodward–Hoffmann rules.

Importance: the concepts outlined in this text changed the field of organic chemistry and ushered in the frontier molecular orbital theory approach toward understanding reactions.

Classics in Total Synthesis
K.C. Nicolaou and E.J. Sorensen
Current edition: 1996

Description. The synthesis of famous molecules done by the masters of organic chemistry

Importance. A standard postgraduate text book for the study of total synthesis and a valuable reference work for experts. "..destined to become a classic itself".

Inorganic chemistry

Chemical Applications of Group Theory
F. Albert Cotton
 Wiley, John & Sons, Incorporated, 1st Ed. 1963, 3rd Ed. 1990.

Description: Explains the use of symmetry groups in describing molecular symmetry and its role in determining molecular properties.

Importance: Significant influence by introducing group theory to a much wider group of chemists.

Advanced Inorganic Chemistry
F. Albert Cotton and Geoffrey Wilkinson
Wiley, John & Sons, Incorporated, 1st Ed. 1962, 6th Ed. 1999

Description: A classic general textbook for an undergraduate 
course in inorganic chemistry

Importance: This book is not only a good introduction to the subject, it was very different from earlier texts and "led to a 
fundamental shift in the way in which inorganic chemistry was studied". It seemed to be symbolic of the renaissance in inorganic chemistry starting in the 1950s. Every new text in inorganic chemistry since this text has had to respond to it.

Inorganic and Theoretical Chemistry
F. Sherwood Taylor and H. M. N. H. Irving
Heinemann, 1st Ed 1931, 10th Ed. 1960

Description:  Unique very advanced and comprehensive coverage of every element known at the time by chapter describing all known compounds yet discovered or synthesised.
Approaches chemistry as the study of elements and compounds without the later emphasis on bond theory and analysis.

Importance:  Inspired and instructed generations of English speaking scientists and students.

Chemistry of the Elements
N. N. Greenwood and A. Earnshaw 
Heinemann (later Elsevier), 1st Ed 1984, 2nd Ed 1997

Description:  Unique comprehensive descriptive coverage of all the elements and their compounds, with a strong focus on 'real life' and industrial applications.

Importance:  The most comprehensive one-volume text on inorganic chemistry available; a worthy successor to Taylor and Irving (see above).

Physical chemistry

Physical Chemistry (Atkins and de Paula)
P. W. Atkins
 Oxford University Press, 1st Ed. 1978, 10th Ed. 2014 (with Julio de Paula from 7th Ed. 2002)

Description: A classic general textbook for an undergraduate course in physical chemistry

Importance: This book is not only a good introduction to the subject, it was very different from earlier texts and altered the way physical chemistry was taught. The first edition was very widely used where English is the language of instruction. Other texts had to respond to the lead from Atkins. The current edition is the 10th edition.

Physical Chemistry (Berry, Rice and Ross)
R. Stephen Berry, Stuart A. Rice, and John Ross
 Oxford University Press, 1st Ed. 1980, 2nd Ed. 2000

Description: An encyclopedic text and reference suitable for advanced undergraduate or graduate study.

Importance: This massive text by outstanding research workers begins with simple systems and proceeds logically to the more complex phenomena of physical chemistry. The original literature is cited extensively, making the work useful as a reference as well as a textbook. Many topics of current research are treated. Its advanced and exhaustive coverage of the field, together with extensive coverage of modern topics, eclipses the former champion, the text by E. A. Moelwyn-Hughes.

Methods in Physical Chemistry (Schäfer, Schmidt)
 Rolf Schäfer, Peter C. Schmidt
 Wiley‐VCH Verlag GmbH & Co. KGaA, 2012

Description: A broad overview of commonly used methods in physical chemistry and their practical aspects.

Importance: This book is designed for students, supporting them in the master and doctoral thesises.

Biochemistry

A Structure for Deoxyribose Nucleic Acid
James D. Watson and Francis Crick
 Nature 171, 737–738 (1953) © Macmillan Publishers Ltd.
 Downloadable PDF

Description: In this paper the structure of DNA was proposed. It consisted of a double helix with a phosphate backbone, unlike Linus Pauling and R.B. Corey's double helix where the backbone consisted of the bases. They conclude with the sly remark: "It has not escaped our notice that the specific pairing we have postulated immediately suggests a possible copying mechanism for the genetic material."

Importance: Topic creator, Breakthrough, Influence

The Structure of the Potassium Channel: Molecular Basis of K+ Conduction and Selectivity
 Declan A. Doyle, João Morais Cabral, Richard A. Pfuetzner, Anling Kuo, Jacqueline M. Gulbis, Steven L. Cohen, Brian T. Chait and Roderick MacKinnon 
 Science 280(5360), 69-77 (1998) © American Association for the Advancement of Science
 Online version

Description: The structure of the potassium channel is determined by X-ray crystallography. Access to the structure provided answers to central questions in biology, regarding the movement of ions across the cell membrane. In particular, the structure revealed the mechanism with by which these channels move potassium ions both quickly and selectively, reliably preventing similarly sized sodium ions from passing through.

Importance Breakthrough, Influence

Analytical chemistry

Statistics for Experimenters: An Introduction to Design, Data Analysis, and Model Building
 George E.P. Box, J. Stuart Hunter & William G. Hunter
 John Wiley and Sons, Inc., 1st Edition 1978, 2nd Edition 2005
Importance: Although almost devoid of classical chemistry, this is the definitive text for any experimentalist.  This is particularly true for any chemist measuring or studying the properties or effects of chemical compounds, mixtures or other substances.

Description: Starting with examples comparing two sets of experimental data, this text explains variance and the calculation of standard deviations, degrees of freedom, the null hypothesis and the "Student's" t-Test by William J. Gosset.  Further chapters discuss the importance of randomization and the analysis of variance (ANOVA) using F distributions before delving into the use of statistically designed experiments including block and factorial designs.  The book finishes with least squares regression analysis along with response surface and mechanistic modeling.

Though chemical examples were few, it should be mentioned that co-author William G. Hunter, George Box's protege, had a Bachelor's and a master's degree in Chemical Engineering with the book written in such a manner that its concepts would easily apply to chemical investigations.

Polymer chemistry

Principles of Polymer Chemistry
 Flory, Paul J.(1953)
 Cornell University Press. 1953, .
Importance: First major text on polymer chemistry; presents both organic and physical chemistry aspects. Written by a chemist who made major contributions to the physical chemistry of polymers, for which he won the Nobel prize in 1974.

Description: Discusses structure and stereochemistry of synthetic polymers, polymerization kinetics, behaviour of polymers in solution, chain dimensions.

Environmental chemistry

Aquatic Chemistry, Chemical Equilibria and Rates in Natural Waters
 Stumm, Werner and James J. Morgan.
 John Wiley and Sons, Inc., 1st Edition 1970, 3rd Edition 1996, .

Description. This book covers the full spectrum of the discipline including acid/base equilibria, carbonate chemistry, mass transfer, complexation, sorption phenomenon, oxidation/reduction, colloid chemistry, and flocculation/coagulation.  The authors generally present the material using a ground up approach that emphasizes fundamental principles of thermodynamics and kinetics.

Importance.  The publication is one of the most widely cited texts in environmental chemistry.  In 1999, Stumm and Morgan received the Stockholm Water Prize for their contributions in the field.  The citation specifically mentioned Aquatic Chemistry where it was described as a "seminal book" which is "used in education all over the world".

Stratospheric sink for chlorofluoromethanes: chlorine atom-catalysed destruction of ozone
Mario J. Molina and F. S. Rowland, Nature 249, 810–812 (1974)

Description: This paper warned of the danger of ozone depletion due to man-made chlorofluorocarbons. The main atmospheric sink for these compounds was identified as ultraviolet photolysis, liberating chlorine atoms which catalyze the destruction of stratospheric ozone and have the potential to significantly deplete the ozone layer.

Importance: Influence, as described in the presentation speech for the Nobel Prize in Chemistry 1995: “The findings presented by this year's laureates in chemistry have had an enormous political and industrial impact. This was because they clearly identified unacceptable environmental hazards in a large, economically important sector.”

Chemical thermodynamics

On the Equilibrium of Heterogeneous Substances
Gibbs, Willard
Trans. Conn. Acad., Vol. III, pp. 108–248, 1876; pp. 343–524, 1878.

Description: paper applied the thermodynamic theory of steam engines to atomic level chemical reactions; i.e., it established equilibrium criteria necessary to predict the thermodynamic tendency of chemical reactions at constant temperature and pressure.

Importance: topic creator; historian Bill Bryson states, in his A Short History of Nearly Everything, that Gibbs’ Equilibrium paper is "the Principia of thermodynamics".  In addition, this paper, in many ways, functions as the mathematical foundation of physical chemistry.

Electrochemistry

Electrochemical Methods: Fundamentals and Applications
Allen J. Bard, Larry R. Faulkner
 John Wiley and Sons, 2nd edition, 2000, 

Description: The defining reference for electrochemistry, coupling thousands of electroanalytical methods with the theory behind them.

Importance: A reference publication.

Theoretical chemistry, quantum chemistry and computational chemistry

Valence and the structure of atoms and molecules
Gilbert N. Lewis
 New York, The Chemical Catalog Company, Inc., 1923.

Description: Discusses ionic and covalent bonding (polar and non-polar).

Importance: The book that introduced the modern concept of the covalent bond as the sharing of electron pairs, and tried to reconcile the chemist's empirical view of the atom with the physicist's and spectroscopist's quantum mechanical view. It could be considered a precursor to Pauling's books.

Introduction to Quantum Mechanics with Applications to Chemistry
Linus Pauling, E. Bright Wilson
 New York, London, McGraw-Hill book company, 1935.

Description: A classic and excellent introduction to quantum mechanics.

Importance: One of the earliest books that introduced quantum mechanics to chemists. It remains well loved by many to this day.

Valence
C. A Coulson
Oxford, Clarendon Press, 1952.
The latest edition is called Coulson's Valence, 3rd Edition, Roy McWeeny, Oxford University Press, 1980

Description: A classic introduction to valence and the theory of chemical binding.

Importance: This book is credited with causing the expansion of interest in molecular orbital theory from the 1950s.

The Nature of the Chemical Bond and the Structure of Molecules and Crystals; An Introduction to Modern Structural Chemistry
Linus Pauling
 Ithaca, N.Y., London, Cornell University Press; H. Milford, Oxford University Press, 1940.

Description: A classic that was the first general book to introduce quantum mechanics to chemists.

Importance: Probably more than any other book, introduced quantum mechanics and, in particular, valence bond theory to experimental chemists.

Density-Functional Theory of Atoms and Molecules
R. G. Parr and W. Yang,
Oxford University Press, New York, 1989.

Description: A very thorough and scholarly account of density functional theory.

Importance: This is a good introduction to the subject, but has particular significance in the way it describes how the theory throws new light on old chemical concepts such as electronegativity.

Car–Parrinello molecular dynamics
Roberto Car and Michele Parrinello,
Phys. Rev. Lett. 55, 2471 (1985)

Description: Unified Approach for Molecular Dynamics and Density Functional Theory.

Importance: First demonstration of ab-initio molecular dynamics, where the forces are computed on-the-fly by means of quantum mechanical electronic structure calculations.

Supramolecular chemistry

Supramolecular Chemistry – Concepts and Perspectives
 Jean-Marie Lehn
 , VCH,
Description:   Comprehensive textbook written by topic creator.

Importance:   Most-popular textbook on subject (according to Amazon.com).  Lehn coined the term "supermolecule" in '73, developed the concept of supramolecular chemistry in '78, and won the Nobel Prize for his supramolecular chemistry work in ’87.

Supramolecular Medicinal Chemistry 
 Michael J. Zaworotko
 Brian D. Moulton
Description:   Selected articles:
"Supramolecular Medicinal Chemistry:  Mixed-Ligand Coordination Complexes".Mol. Pharmaceutics, 2007, 4 (3), pp 373–385;"Pharmaceutical co-crystals".Journal of Pharmaceutical Sciences, 2006, 95 (3), pp 499–516;"Crystal engineering of pharmaceutical co-crystals from polymorphic active pharmaceutical ingredients". Chem. Commun., 2005, pp 4601 – 4603; "Recent advances of discrete coordination complexes and coordination polymers in drug delivery". Coord. Chem. Rev., 2011, 255, pp 1623–1641.

Importance: Breakthrough, Influence

Medicinal chemistry

The Practice of Medicinal Chemistry
Camille Georges Wermuth editor
 Academic Press, 1996, 
 2nd edition, Academic Press, 2003, 

Description: A great overview of the theory, methodology, and techniques of drug design.

Importance: Introduction, Influence

See also 

 List of scientific journals
 List of scientific journals in chemistry

Notes

Further reading

Chemistry
Publications
History of chemistry